Linden-Kildare Consolidated Independent School District is a public school district based in Linden, Texas, United States.

In addition to Linden, the district also serves the unincorporated community of Kildare.

In 2009, the school district was rated "academically acceptable" by the Texas Education Agency.

School
Linden-Kildare High School (Grades 9-12)
Mae Luster Stephens Junior High (Grades 6-8)
Linden Elementary (Grades PK-5)

Notable alumni
 Will Holland - Tooth & Nail Recording artist The Lonely Hearts
 Josiah Holland - Tooth & Nail Recording artist The Lonely Hearts
 Don Henley - Founding member of The Eagles
 John Beasley (basketball)  -  Professional Basketball Player
 Richard Bowden - Musician and member of Pinkard and Bowden Country duo

References

External links
Linden-Kildare Consolidated ISD

School districts in Cass County, Texas